Three ships in the United States Navy have been named USS Water Witch.

  was a steamer built in 1844 and 1845
  was a modification of the hull of the first, launched in 1847. Her machinery went to the third ship.
  was a wooden-hulled, sidewheel gunboat, launched in 1851. She was shot at on an expedition to Paraguay.

United States Navy ship names